The , abbreviated as , is one of the main operators of expressways and toll roads in Japan. It is headquartered in Kasumigaseki, Chiyoda, Tokyo.

The company was established on October 1, 2005 as a result of the privatization of Japan Highway Public Corporation. The company manages roadways mainly in the Kantō and Tōhoku regions as well as on Hokkaido. Roadways in other regions of Japan are managed by Central Nippon Expressway Company and West Nippon Expressway Company.

References

External links 
 East Nippon Expressway Company

Expressway companies of Japan
Transport companies based in Tokyo
Government-owned companies of Japan
Transport companies established in 2005
Japanese companies established in 2005